Myo Naing is a Burmese chess International Master. He is a five-time Myanmar National Chess Championship winner (1989, 1992, 1999, 2005, 2010).

References

1964 births
Chess International Masters
Burmese chess players
Living people